Joseph Poelaert (21 March 1817 – 3 November 1879) was a Belgian architect. He was entrusted with important projects in Brussels, such as Saint Catherine's Church, the Church of Our Lady of Laeken, the Congress Column, the Royal Theatre of la Monnaie and above all, the Palace of Justice. He was also the great-uncle of the architect Henri Van Dievoet.

Life

Early life
Joseph Poelaert was born in Brussels on 21 March 1817. His father was Philip Poelaert (1790–1875), a former architecture student at the Royal Academy of Fine Arts in Brussels. The young Poelaert also trained there under Tilman-François Suys, and then in Paris under Louis Visconti and Jean-Nicolas Huyot.

He first came to attention with his winning competition entry for the Congress Column in 1849. He was made city architect of Brussels in 1856.

Palace of Justice
Poelaert's most significant commission was the colossal Palace of Justice of Brussels, the largest single building constructed in the 19th century and even copied in smaller scale at the Palace of Justice in Lima, Peru.

For the Palace of Justice's construction, a section of the Marolles/Marollen neighbourhood was demolished. Poelaert himself resided in the Marolles, only a few hundred metres from the building, on the /, in a house adjoining his vast offices and workshops and communicating with them. It is thus unlikely he saw himself as ruining the neighbourhood. Nonetheless, many angry citizens personally blamed Poelaert for the forced relocations, and the expression schieven architect (meaning "shameful architect") became one of the most serious insults in the dialect of the Marolles.

Later life and death
Poelaert retired in 1874 to his villa at the Grande Grille, on 363, /, in the then-rural village of Laeken. He died on 3 November 1879 and was buried in Laeken Cemetery under a miniature version of his Palace of Justice.

Works
 1850–1859: Congress Column in Brussels
 1854–1874: Saint Catherine's Church in Brussels
 1854–1909: Church of Our Lady of Laeken in Brussels, site of the Royal Crypt of the Belgian Royal Family
 1855–1857: Restoration of the Royal Theatre of la Monnaie in Brussels, after the fire of 1855
 1866–1883: Palace of Justice in Brussels

References

Notes

Bibliography

External links
 

Architects from Brussels
1817 births
1879 deaths
Burials at Laeken Cemetery
Belgian neoclassical architects
Chevaliers of the Légion d'honneur
19th-century Belgian architects
Académie Royale des Beaux-Arts alumni